Ernest P. Hickman  (1856–1891), was a Major League Baseball pitcher. He played for the Kansas City Cowboys of the Union Association in 1884.

He committed suicide on November 19, 1891 with a self-inflicted gunshot wound to the head. He was 35 years old.

References

External links

1856 births
1891 deaths
Major League Baseball pitchers
Baseball players from Illinois
Kansas City Cowboys (UA) players
Suicides by firearm in Illinois
19th-century baseball players
1890s suicides
Murder–suicides in Illinois
American murderers
Uxoricides
Multiple gunshot suicides

 Ernie Hickman at SABR (Baseball BioProject)